Hilary Topham Corke (12 July 1921 – 3 September 2001) was an English writer, composer and mineralogist.

Corke was born in Malvern, Worcestershire. He served in the Royal Artillery during World War II.

His poems appeared in Poetry Now (1956) and Penguin Book of Contemporary Verse (1962 edition). Together with Anthony Thwaite and William Plomer he edited New Poems 1961: A P.E.N Anthology of Contemporary Poetry. He died at Abinger Hammer, Surrey, aged 80.

References

External links
 , updated after his death

1921 births
2001 deaths
People from Malvern, Worcestershire
English mineralogists
Royal Artillery officers
British Army personnel of World War II
Academics of the University of Edinburgh
English composers
English male poets
20th-century English poets
20th-century English male writers